Kabaddi is a contact team sport. Played between two teams of seven players, the objective of the game is for a single player on offense, referred to as a "raider", to run into the opposing team's half of the court, touch out as many of their players and return to their own half of the court, all without being tackled by the defenders in 30 seconds. Points are scored for each player tagged by the raider, while the opposing team earns a point for stopping the raider. Players are taken out of the game if they are touched or tackled, but are brought back in for each point scored by their team from a tag or a tackle.

It is popular in the Indian subcontinent and other surrounding Asian countries. Although accounts of kabaddi appear in the histories of ancient India, the game was popularised as a competitive sport in the 20th century. It is the national sport of Bangladesh. It is the state game of the Indian states of Chhattisgarh, Tamil Nadu, Andhra Pradesh, Bihar, Haryana, Karnataka, Kerala, Maharashtra, Odisha, Punjab, Telangana, and Uttar Pradesh.

There are two major disciplines of kabaddi: "Punjabi kabaddi", also referred to as "circle styles", comprises traditional forms of the sport that are played on a circular field outdoors, while the "standard style", played on a rectangular court indoors, is the discipline played in major professional leagues and international competitions such as the Asian Games.

This game is known by numerous names in different parts of the Indian subcontinent, such as: kabaddi or chedugudu in Andhra Pradesh and Telangana; kabaddi in Maharashtra, Karnataka and Kerala; kabaddi, komonti or ha-du-du in West Bengal and Bangladesh; bhavatik in Maldives, kauddi or kabaddi in the Punjab region; hu-tu-tu in Western India, hu-do-do in Eastern India; chadakudu in South India; kapardi in Nepal; kabadi or sadugudu in Tamil Nadu; and chakgudu in Sri Lanka.

History 

Kabaddi is a sport developed centered on Jallikattu. It is common among the Ayar tribal people who lived in the Mullai geographical region of ancient Tamil Nadu. A player going to the opposition is treated like a Bull. It is like taming a bull without touching it, as it is mentioned in Sangam Literature that the game called Sadugudu was practised since ages. There are also accounts of Gautam Buddha having played the game recreationally. There is another version to this sport origins and rich history, Legend has it that kabaddi originated in Tamil Nadu over 4,000 years ago.

The game was said to have been popular among the Yadava people. An Abhang by Tukaram stated that the lord Krishna  played the game in his youth.

Modern kabaddi is a synthesis of the game played in various forms under different names in the Indian subcontinent. India has been first credited with having helped to popularise kabaddi as a competitive sport, with the first organized competitions occurring in the 1920s, their introduction to the programme of the Indian Olympic Games in 1938, the establishment of the All-India Kabaddi Federation in 1950, and it being played as a demonstration sport at the inaugural 1951 Asian Games in New Delhi. These developments helped to formalize the sport, which had traditionally been played in villages, for legitimate international competition.

After being demonstrated again at the 1982 Asian Games in Delhi, Kabaddi was added to the Asian Games programme beginning in 1990.

Variations

Standard style

Each has five supplementary players held in reserve for substitution. The game is played with 20-minute halves with a 5-minute half time break in which the teams exchange sides. During each play, known as a "raid", a player from the attacking side, known as the "raider", runs into the opposing team's side of the court and attempts to tag as many of the seven defending players as possible. The raider must cross the baulk line into the defending team's territory, and then return to their half of the field without being tackled. (If an attacker touches a defender and hasn't yet reached the baulk line, they don't need to reach the baulk line to score points and may return to their half of the court.) While raiding, the raider must loudly chant kabaddi, confirming to referees that their raid is done on a single breath without inhaling. Each raid has a 30-second time limit.

A point is scored for each defender tagged; tags can be made with the raider's hand or foot. If the raider steps beyond the bonus line marked in the defending team's territory when there are 5 or more players, they earn an additional point known as a bonus point. If the raider is successfully stopped (tackled), the opposite team earns a point instead. All players tagged are taken out of the game, but one is "revived" for each point a team scores from a subsequent tag or tackle. Bonus points do not revive players. Players who step out of the boundary are out. A raid where no points are scored by the raider is referred to as an "empty raid". By contrast, a play where the raider scores three or more points is referred to as a "super raid". If a team gets all seven players on the opposing team out at once ("All Out"), they earn two additional points and the players are placed back in the game.

Circle style

There are four major forms of Indian kabaddi recognised by the amateur federation. In Sanjeevani kabaddi, one player is revived against one player of the opposite team who is out. The game is played over 40 minutes with a five-minute break between halves. There are seven players on each side and the team that outs all the players on the opponent's side scores four extra points. In Gaminee style, seven players play on each side and a player put out has to remain out until all his team members are out. The team that is successful in outing all the players of the opponent's side secures a point. The game continues until five or seven such points are secured and has no fixed time duration. Amar style resembles the Sanjeevani form in the time frame rule, but a player who is declared out stays inside the court while play continues. For every player of the opposition touched "out", a team earns a point.

International competitions
The following competitions are played in standard format, for that of circle style kabaddi, see Punjabi kabaddi.

Kabaddi World Cup

The Kabaddi World Cup is an outdoor international standard style kabaddi competition conducted by the International Kabaddi Federation (IKF), contested by men's and women's national teams. The competition has been previously contested in 2004, 2007 and 2016. All the tournaments have been won by India. India defeated Iran by 38–29 in the final of the championship game to clinch the title of 2016.

After the establishment of a new kabaddi organization named World Kabaddi Federation, a 2019 Kabaddi World Cup was held in April 2019 at Malacca, Malaysia. It was the largest world cup in kabaddi history, consisting of 32 men's teams and 24 women's teams.

Asian Games

Kabaddi was played as a demonstration event at the First Asian Games in 1951, and again in 1982, before becoming a medal event for the first time in 1990.

The Indian national team won every men's and women's kabaddi competition in the Asian Games from 2002 through 2014. At the 2018 Asian Games, Iran became the first country other than India to win gold medals in kabaddi, with India's men's team winning bronze, and India's women's team being beaten by Iran to win silver.

Pro Kabaddi League

The Pro Kabaddi League was established in 2014. The league modeled its business upon that of the Indian Premier League of Twenty20 cricket, with a large focus on marketing, the backing of local broadcaster Star Sports, and changes to the sport's rules and its presentation to make it more suitable for a television audience. The Pro Kabaddi League quickly became a ratings success on Indian television; the 2014 season was watched by at least 435 million viewers over the course of the season, and the inaugural championship match was seen by 98.6 million viewers.

Additional rules are used in the Pro Kabaddi League to encourage scoring: when a defensive side has three or fewer players remaining, tackles are worth two points instead of one. Furthermore, if a team performs two empty raids in a row, the next raider must score a point, or else they will be declared out and the opposing team will score a point.

Indo International Premier Kabaddi League
The inaugural edition of the IIPKL was on 13 May at Pune, India. The title for the inaugural season was won by the Bangalore Rhinos.

Super Kabaddi League

In May 2018, the Super Kabaddi League was first held in Pakistan, as part of a larger push to promote renewed interest in the sport in Pakistan.

Asian Kabaddi Championship

AKC's tenth season was played in Gorgan, Iran, in 2017 in which India won its tenth gold by defeating Pakistan in the finals.

Kabaddi Masters

The inaugural edition of the Kabaddi Masters was held in Dubai, 22–30 June 2018. It was the first kabaddi tournament to be held in the UAE. It featured 6 teams. India won the tournament by defeating Iran in the final with a scoreline of 44–26, with the Indian Defense outperforming the Iran Defense.

Junior World Kabaddi championship

The inaugural Junior Kabaddi World Championship was held in Kish island, Iran, 11–14 November 2019. It featured 13 teams.  Iran won the tournament by defeating Kenya in the final, 42–22. Team India did not participate in this tournament.

European Kabaddi championship
The first edition of European Kabaddi Championship was held in Scotland in 2019. The final match was between Poland and Holland, Poland won the tournament. Final score was Poland 47–27 Holland. The second edition was held in Cyprus in 2021 which was organized by World Kabaddi Federation. Poland retained their title by beating hosts Cyprus in the final, 29-15. Italy is set to host the third edition in 2022.

Popularity

Kabaddi is a popular sport in the Indian subcontinent. The Kabaddi Federation of India (KFI) was founded in 1950, and it compiled a standard set of rules. The governing body for kabaddi in Pakistan is Pakistan Kabaddi Federation.

In Bangladesh, Kabaddi is known with a different name called "Ha-du-du". Ha-du-du has no definite rules and is played with different rules in different areas. Kabaddi is the national sport of Bangladesh, given official status in 1972. The Amateur Kabaddi Federation of Bangladesh was formed in 1973.

In Iran, the Community of Kabaddi was formed in 1996 (the same year they joined the Asian Kabaddi Federation), and in 2001 they joined the International Kabaddi Federation. The Iran Amateur Kabaddi Federation was formed in 2004.

Kabaddi is among the national sports of Nepal. Kabaddi is played and taught in most primary schools beginning in about the third grade in most Nepali schools. Kabaddi was also played by the British Army for fun, to keep fit and as an enticement to recruit soldiers from the British Asian community. Kabaddi was brought to United Kingdom by Indian, Nepali and Sri Lankan immigrants.

Media

Movies 
 Okkadu (Telugu; 2003): A state-level kabaddi player trying to prove his parents that he can be successful in it. The film was subsequently remade in four other Indian languages. It has since been remade in Tamil as Ghilli and Kannada as Ajay.
Student of the Year 2 (Hindi; 2019): A kabaddi player tries to become student of the year.
Panga (Hindi; 2020): A former kabaddi world champion attempts a comeback after being a mother for 7 years.

Television 
 Burning Kabaddi (2021): A Japanese anime about a high school Kabaddi team. It is based on the manga of the same name.

See also

Jallikattu
Ghilli
Kabaddi in India
Kho kho
Punjabi Kabaddi

References

Further reading

External links

 World Kabaddi
 
 
 "A Game Called Kabbadi", slideshow by The New York Times
 

 
Traditional sports of India
Traditional sports of Pakistan
Sports originating in India
Sports originating in South Asia
National symbols of Bangladesh
Traditional sports of Bangladesh